Choiromyces aboriginum is a species of truffle-like fungi in genus Choiromyces, which is part of the Tuberaceae family. It is found in several regions in Australia, where it has been used as a food and as a source of water.

Distribution
This fungus is found in the dry areas of South Australia, Western Australia and the Northern Territory.

Uses
In Australia, it has been used as traditional native food and has also been used as a source of water. The fruiting bodies were eaten raw or cooked and Kalotas reported one experience, as follows: "They were cooked in hot sand and ashes for over an hour, and then eaten. They had a rather soft consistency (a texture akin to that of soft, camembert-like cheese) and a bland taste. Cooked specimens left for 24 hours and then reheated developed a flavour like that of baked cheese."

References

Pezizales